The AICPA Code of Professional Conduct is a collection of codified statements issued by the American Institute of Certified Public Accountants that outline a CPA's ethical and professional responsibilities. The code establishes standards for auditor independence, integrity and objectivity, responsibilities to clients and colleagues and acts discreditable to the accounting profession. The AICPA is responsible for drafting, revising and reissuing the code annually, on June 1. The current Code is available at the AICPA Web site. For older versions of the Code, see the links below.

History
Joseph Edmund Sterrett outlined the debate and issues in setting up a Code of Professional Conduct in his address to the annual meeting of the American Association of Public Accountants in 1907   The earliest "official" version of the code of professional conduct among American accountants was issued by the American Institute of Accountants on April 9, 1917.

Notable sections

Section 51 - Preamble 
The opening principle of the code is that membership, and therefore adherence, to the code is voluntary. This means that an accountant is never under a legal responsibility to adhere to the code, and can renounce the code and membership in the AICPA at any time.

Section 101 - Independence 
Section 101 sets forth the various requirements to establish auditor independence and conditions that nullify it. Knowingly allowing a member who is not independent to continue to work on an engagement can result in disciplinary action from the AICPA, including possible revocation of the members status as a CPA. Generally, the following actions will impair auditor independence:
 Authorizing, executing or consummating a transaction, or otherwise exercising authority on behalf of a client or having the authority to do so.
 Preparing source documents, in electronic or other form, evidencing the occurrence of a transaction.
 Having custody of client assets.
 Supervising client employees in the performance of their normal recurring activities.
 Determining which recommendations of the member should be implemented.
 Reporting to the board of directors on behalf of management.
 Serving as a client's stock transfer or escrow agent, registrar, general counsel or its equivalent.
 Establishing or maintaining internal controls, including performing ongoing monitoring activities.

Auditor independence is impaired if a member on the engagement team has a direct or material indirect financial interest in the client. Member's on the engagement team are not allowed to be on the board of trustees of a trust that owns, or has committed to owning more than 10% of the client's equity. A member or any of their immediate family are not allowed to own more than 5% of the clients equity. For the period being audited, the auditor is not allowed to operate as an officer, director, manager, promoter, underwriter or voting trustee for the client. If a member leaves the auditing firm and is employed by the client, the entire firms independence is deemed to be impaired. If an audit member is made a job offer by the client and does not immediately report and remove themselves from the engagement, their independence is impaired. However, if the member does report the job offer and rejects it, and is no longer being considered for a position with the client, then their independence is not impaired.

When the auditing member has a previous employment relationship with the client, barring certain exceptions, the auditor is required to liquidate any employee welfare programs that they have vested benefits in and collect or pay any loans outstanding to the client. The immediate family of the auditor is considered part of the test for impairment of independence. The exception to this is that the immediate family members of auditors are allowed to work for the client in non-management roles. If the auditor provides non-attest services such as tax support or consulting, they are required to adhere to the independence requirements of other regulatory bodies that govern those services. Failure to do so will impair their independence for their audit engagement as well.

List of AICPA Code of Conduct and by-laws sections from AICPA Professional standards, 1974-2007

List of AICPA Code of Conduct and By-Laws Sections published as pamphlets, 1917-1997

References 

Codes of conduct
Accounting in the United States